The Center for Cultural Judaism was established in New York in 2003 to serve secular Jews. The Center focuses on implementing educational and outreach programs designed to reach Jews who do not find meaning in Judaism as a religion, but for whom Judaism as a culture is meaningful.

Posen Project
The Center for Cultural Judaism provides grants through the Posen Project for the study of secular Jewish history and cultures. These grants are intended to cultivate and support the interdisciplinary study of secular Jewish history and cultures within already well-established university programs and departments of Jewish Studies, History, Philosophy, Sociology, Anthropology, and other related disciplines. Grants are awarded to support the teaching of two to four courses per year in the origin, history, development, texts, philosophy, writings, and practices of Jewish secularism.

Over thirty institutions in North America and Europe are associated with the Posen Project for the study of secular Jewish history and cultures. New institutions joining the project recently include Brandeis University, Goucher College, Harvard University, Lehigh University, Rice University, Sorbonne - School of Graduate Studies, University College London, University of Kansas, and University of Wroclaw.

Similar programs are underway in Israel at the University of Haifa, Tel Aviv University, Ofakim Teachers' Program at Tel Aviv University, the Interdisciplinary Center Herzliya, and the Open University, among others.

Journals

Secular Culture & Ideas 
Secular Culture & Ideas is a journal that explores how secular Jews connect to their heritage through Jewish art, history, languages, literature, philosophy, foodways, folklore, and politics. The journal offers a range of articles on subjects including Roots of Jewish Secularism, Secular Thinkers, Holidays, and Life-Cycle, as well as past issues and a blog, Secular News & Notes.

Contemplate 
Since its debut in 2001, Contemplate: The International Journal of Cultural Jewish Thought has published three volumes of essays, articles, and poetry about secular Jewish culture and progressive Jewish politics. Its contributors have included Amos Oz, Ilan Stavans, A.B. Yehoshua, and Robert Pinsky. It is published annually.

On-Site Resources

A central library of books, articles, and videos on secular, Humanistic, and cultural Judaism is being created at the center, which sells books as well. 

The site also functions as a meeting space and hosts cultural Jewish celebrations, services, and rites of passage aimed towards non-religious, secular, cultural, and Humanistic Jews.

See also
Secular Jewish Culture
Humanistic Judaism
Society for Humanistic Judaism
City Congregation for Humanistic Judaism
Posen Foundation

External links
Official website
Secular Culture & Ideas website

2003 establishments in New York City
 Secular Jewish culture in the United States
 Jews and Judaism in New York City
Jewish organizations based in New York City